Le Fils naturel is a 1757 play by Denis Diderot.  This play tells the story of Dorval, a young man of unknown parentage, who is welcomed into the family of Clairville and his widow sister Constance.  Rosalie, Clairville's fiancé, also lives there.  Dorval and Rosalie fall in love, and Dorval struggles with his love for Rosalie and his respect for Clairville.  When Rosalie's father arrives to bless Clairville and Rosalie's marriage, he acknowledges that Dorval is his illegitimate son.  Rosalie and Dorval then realize that the love that they share is familial rather than romantic.  Rosalie marries Clairville, and Dorval marries Constance.

Diderot followed this play with a treatise on theatre entitled Entretiens sur le fils naturel.

External links
 Le Fils naturel in French at Gallica

1757 plays
Plays by Denis Diderot